Potupo District is one of 10 districts of River Gee County, Liberia. As of 2008, the population was 7,337.

References

Districts of Liberia
River Gee County